Alexandros Malis (born 19 March 1997) is a Greek professional footballer who plays as a centre-back for Super League club Panetolikos.

Career

Panetolikos
Malis began his career with the youth club of Panetolikos.  He signed his first professional contract in July 2016.

He made his debut with Panetolikos on 4 January 2017 coming on in the 94th minute in a match against AEK Athens.

Loan to Neos Amfilochos
On 23 August 2017, Malis joined Neos Amfilochos on a one-year loan.

References

External links
SuperLeague Profile

1997 births
Living people
Greek footballers
Super League Greece players
Gamma Ethniki players
Panetolikos F.C. players
Association football defenders
Footballers from Agrinio